Maurice Debesse (1903–1998) was a French educator.

References
 Maurice Debesse Paris, UNESCO: 

French educators
People from Firminy
1903 births
1998 deaths